Adlai may refer to:

 Adlai (biblical figure), the father of Shaphat, and the grandfather of the prophet Elisha
 Adlai, West Virginia, unincorporated community, United States
 The first name of Adlai Stevenson I, Grover Cleveland's Vice President
 The first name of Adlai E. Stevenson II, grandson of the above entry, former Governor of Illinois, and unsuccessful Presidential candidate
 The first name of Adlai E. Stevenson III, son of the above entry, and former Senator from Illinois
 The first name of Adlai E. Stevenson IV, son of the above entry, business executive and former journalist
 The colloquial name of an annual collegiate debating competition held by Princeton University's American Whig-Cliosophic Society as part of the American Parliamentary Debate Association
 Job's tears, a grain sometimes known as adlay or adlay millet
 Stevenson High School (Lincolnshire, Illinois), full name Adlai E. Stevenson High School